Adwick le Street and Carcroft is a ward in the metropolitan borough of Doncaster, South Yorkshire, England.  The ward contains 33 listed buildings that are recorded in the National Heritage List for England.  Of these, one is listed at Grade II*, the middle of the three grades, and the others are at Grade II, the lowest grade. The ward contains the villages of Adwick le Street and Carcroft, and the surrounding area.  Most of the listed buildings are in the model village of Woodlands, and consist of houses built for the Brodsworth Colliery Company, and designed by Percy Houfton in Arts and Crafts style.  Also in the model village are a church and two schools.  Elsewhere, the listed buildings consist of an older church, the remains of a churchyard cross and a memorial in the churchyard, a former water mill, a large house later used as a club, a war memorial in the form of a clock tower, and a miners' welfare institute.


Key

Buildings

References

Citations

Sources

 

Lists of listed buildings in South Yorkshire
Buildings and structures in the Metropolitan Borough of Doncaster